The House I Live In is a Soviet war film, shot in the Gorky Film Studio in 1957, directed by Lev Kulidzhanov and Yakov Segel.

The film was the movie premiere of Zhanna Bolotova.

Plot 
The story begins in 1935 as some recent arrivals occupy a new house on the outskirts of Moscow.  The occupants' lives throughout the events of the Second World War are chronicled.

Cast 
 Vladimir Zemlyanikin as Seryozha
 Yevgeny Matveyev as Konstantin
Rimma Shorohova  as  Katya
Valentina Telegina as Klavdia Kondratyevna Davydova
Nikolay Elizarov as  Pavel Davydov
Pavel Shalnov as Nikolay
 Mikhail Ulyanov as  Dmitry Fedorovich Kashirin, geologist
 Ninel Myshkova as Lida Kashirina
 Klavdia Yelanskaya as  Ksenia Nikolaevna, actress
 Zhanna Bolotova as Galya Volynskaya
 Cleopatra Alperova as  Elena Petrovna Volynskaya
 Lev Kulidzhanov as Vadim Nikolaevich Volynsky
 Jura Myasnikov as Sergey in the childhood
 Zoya Danilina as Galya as a child 
Song composer of Yuri Biryukov to  words of Alexey Fatyanov  Silence of Rogozhskaya Force  takes Nikolai Rybnikov.

Release
The premiere of the film took place in the Soviet Union on 23 December 1957. It was the 9th most distributed film of that year, with 28.9 million viewers.

References

External links 
 
 Дом, в котором я живу on RUSKINO.RU

1957 films
1957 drama films
Gorky Film Studio films
Soviet drama films
Films set in Moscow
Soviet black-and-white films
Films directed by Lev Kulidzhanov
1950s Russian-language films